Nimia, founded in 2013 by Zachary McIntosh and Eric Harrison, is an international technology company specializing in video licensing (stock footage), management, and distribution related products and services. These include a stock footage marketplace and digital asset management software. The company is headquartered in the USA.

References

External links
 

Companies based in Seattle
Stock footage
Technology companies of the United States